Warszawa '81 is an EP by the Serbian new wave band Električni Orgazam. The EP was recorded live during the three dates tour in Warsaw, Poland. The cover, designed by Srđan Gojković Gile featured the Polish language version of the band's name, Elektryczny Orgazm. The EP was rereleased by Yellow Dog records in 1996.

The EP

Track listing 
 "Električni orgazam" (Gojković) (4:05)
 "Razgovori" (Mazagro) (1:50)
 "Konobar" (Đukić) (3:09)
 "Leptir" (Mazagro) (3:09) 
 "Vi" (Vukićević, Gojković) (2:14)
 "I've Got a Feeling" (Lennon, McCartney) (2:22)

Integral version

Track listing 
 "Elektricni orgazam" (4:07)
 "Bomba" (2:16)
 "Devojke" (1:43)
 "Odelo" (2:08)
 "Afrika" (2:03)
 "Razgovori" (1:54)
 "Podstanar" (1:47)
 "Leptir" (3:25)
 "Konobar" (1:09)
 "Voda u moru" (3:56)
 "I've Got a Feeling" (3:03) 
 "Dokolica" (2:30)
 "Vi" (2:18)
 "Krokodili dolaze" (3:44)
 "Nebo" (3:44)
 "Zlatni papagaj" (3:16)

Personnel 
 Srđan Gojković Gile (guitar, vocals)
 Ljubomir Jovanović Jovec (drums, guitar)
 Ljubomir Đukić Ljuba (keyboards, vocals)
 Jovan Jovanović Grof (bass)
 Branko Kuštrin Mango (drums)

References 
 Official website discography page
 Warszawa '81 at Discogs

1981 EPs
Live EPs
1996 live albums
1981 live albums
Električni Orgazam live albums